Manny Montana (born September 26, 1983) is an American actor.

Early life and education
Manny Montana was born and raised in Long Beach, California. After graduating from Jordan High School, Montana got a football scholarship to California State University Sacramento, but quit after an arm injury and dislocating his shoulder for the eighth time. He transferred to California State University, Long Beach to major in Journalism and Broadcasting. He worked as a DJ in the school's student-radio station, which landed him an intern position at Power 100.3. He is a first generation Mexican-American.

Career
After graduating in 2006, Montana acted in a number of student films which eventually led him to guest star in single episodes of various television series. In 2012, Montana was cast as Johnny "J.T." Turturro in Graceland. In regards to fan reaction to the show, he stated: "Being cast on a regular procedural, where everything gets wrapped up by the end of the episode was always a fear of mine because that doesn't really test you as an actor. On this show, every week we're playing somebody different, there's great dialogue, I love my co-stars, it's fun to be at work and I think the fans are seeing that. Regardless of whether they like the show or not, I think they like the cast and the dynamic we have together."

In 2015, Montana appeared in Michael Mann's Blackhat as Lozano, a "wanted criminal". Montana auditioned for a lead role and did not receive it, but got offered a supporting role.

Since 2018, he has been a member of the main cast of Good Girls as Rio. The show was cancelled after four seasons. Then, Montana starred in the show "All American" as the character Coach Dante Smart for the episode.  In 2022, after what seemed like a long hiatus for the actor, it was announced on April that the Long Beach native would join the show Mayans M.C. as a member of the Yuma Mayans.

Personal life
Montana is married to Adelfa Marr, with whom he has one child. Marr is a life coach providing services digitally. The couple keeps their life private and their child away from the public.

Filmography

References

External links
 
 Manny Montana on Instagram
 

21st-century American male actors
American male television actors
American male film actors
Living people
Male actors from Long Beach, California
American male actors of Mexican descent
1983 births